Uli Biaho is a mountain near Trango Towers and Baltoro Glacier in the Gilgit–Baltistan area of Pakistan.  It consists of two main peaks, Uli Biaho Tower (listed by Roskelley as 19,957 feet, and by Kopold as ); and Uli Biaho Peak (Kopold: 6417 m), which as of 2006 was unclimbed.

Uli Biaho Tower was climbed alpine-style via the direct East Face by John Roskelley et al. All four US climbers reached the summit on July 3, 1979. Roskelley included a chapter on Uli Biaho in his 1993 book Stories Off the Wall.

Notable ascents
 1979 - Uli Biaho Tower (19,957 feet) - East Face - VII F8 A4 (34 pitches).  June 24 - July 5, 1979 - John Roskelley, Kim Schmitz, Ron Kauk and Bill Forrest.
 1988 - Uli Biaho Tower - Pilone Sud (6b, A3, 800 м) 17, June 19–21, 1988 - Maurizio Giordani, Roberto Manfrini, Maurizio Venzo, Kurt Walde.
 2006 - Uli Biaho Tower (20,058 feet or 6109 m) - Drastissima VI/6 ABO (Northwest Face). June 23–25, 2006 - Gabo Cmarik and Jozef 'Dodo' Kopold (Slovakia).
 2013 - Uli Biaho Tower - West Face 6a/6b, 1 aid pitch (18 pitches), the rest free climbing on sight in one day and half, July 21, 2013 - Matteo Della Bordella, Luca Schiera and Silvan Schüpbach.
 2013 - Uli Biaho Tower - East Face -  Russian Roulette (1,900m 6c+ A2) - August 8–14, 2013 - Denis Veretenin and Evgenii Bashkirtcev

See also
 Highest Mountains of the World

References

Mountains of Gilgit-Baltistan
Six-thousanders of the Karakoram